Tup'o station is a railway station in Tup'o-ri, Kosŏng county, Kangwŏn province, North Korea on the Kŭmgangsan Ch'ŏngnyŏn Line of the Korean State Railway.

History

The station, originally called Tubaek station, was opened on 21 May 1932 by the Chosen Government Railway, along with the rest of the third section of the original Tonghae Pukpu Line from T'ongch'ŏn (nowadays Tonghae) to here.

References

Railway stations in North Korea